Linden Grove is a historic home located at Frederick, Frederick County, Maryland, United States. It is a -story, second-quarter-19th-century transitional Federal-Greek Revival Flemish bond brick house. A porch was added to the house in about 1900. Outbuildings include a one-story stuccoed hip-roofed smokehouse and a mid-late 19th century two-story tenant house, with an addition from about 1930.

Linden Grove was listed on the National Register of Historic Places in 1987.

References

External links
, including photo in 2006, at Maryland Historical Trust

Houses completed in 1823
Federal architecture in Maryland
Greek Revival houses in Maryland
Houses in Frederick County, Maryland
Houses on the National Register of Historic Places in Maryland
National Register of Historic Places in Frederick County, Maryland